This is an incomplete list of Statutory Instruments of the United Kingdom in 1962. This listing includes the complete, 74 items, "Partial Dataset" as listed on www.legislation.gov.uk (as at September 2017).

Statutory Instruments

1-499
The Overseas Service Superannuation (Amendment) Order, 1962 SI 1962/44
The Superannuation (National Fire Service and Fire Brigades) Transfer Rules, 1962 SI 1962/109
The Superannuation (Transfer of Hostels Staff) Rules, 1962 SI 2962/158
The Visiting Forces Act (Application to the Isle of Man) Order 1962 SI 1962/170
The Commonwealth Telegraphs (Cable and Wireless Ltd. Pension) Regulations, 1962 SI 1962/196
The Construction (General Provisions) Reports Order, 1962 SI 1962/224
The Construction (Lifting Operations) Reports Order, 1962 SI 1962/225
The Construction (Lifting Operations) Prescribed Particulars Order, 1962 SI 1962/226
The London Cab Order, 1962 SI 1962/289
The Deeds of Arrangement (Amendment) Rules 1962 SI 1962/297 (L. 5)
The Sovereign Base Areas of Akrotiri and Dhekelia (Boundaries) Order in Council, 1962 SI 1962/396
The Statutory Orders (Special Procedure) Order, 1962 SI 1962/409

500-999
The British Wool Marketing Scheme (Amendment) Order, 1962 SI 1962/622
The Reciprocal Enforcement of Foreign Judgments (Norway) Order 1962 SI 1962/636
The Consular Conventions (Income Tax) (Spanish State) Order 1962 SI 1962/638
The Evidence (Barbados) Order 1962 SI 1962/641
The Evidence (Hong Kong) Order 1962 SI 1962/642
The Evidence (Jamaica) Order 1962 SI 1962/643
The Evidence (Montserrat) Order 1962 SI 1962/644
The Trustee Investments (Additional Powers) Order, 1962 SI 1962/658
The Housing (Management of Houses in Multiple Occupation) Regulations 1962 SI 1962/668
The Exchange of Securities Rules 1962 SI 1962/868
The British Transport Commission Group Pension Funds Regulations, 1962 SI 1962/898
The Exchange of Securities (No.2) Rules 1962 SI 1962/906
The Trunk Roads (40 m.p.h. Speed Limit Direction) (No.27) Order 1962 S.I. 1962/973

1000-1499
The Cambridge Waterworks Order, 1962 SI 1962/1030
The Exchange of Securities (No.3) Rules 1962 SI 1962/1219
The Food and Drugs (Legal Proceedings) Regulations 1962 SI 1962/1287
The Exempt Charities Order 1962 SI 1962/1343

1500-1999
The Exchange of Securities (Consolidation) Rules 1962 SI 1962/1562
The Visiting Forces Act (Application to Colonies) (Amendment) Order 1962 SI 1962/1638
The Visiting Forces (Designation) (Sovereign Base Areas of Akrotiri and Dhekelia) Order 1962 SI 1962/1639
Non-ferrous Metals (Melting and Founding) Regulations 1962 SI 1962/1667
The Opencast Coal (Notice of Work) (Amendment) Regulations 1962 SI 1962/1696
The Land Drainage (General) (Amendment) Regulations 1962 SI 1962/1734
The River Taw Mussel Fishery Order 1962 SI 1962/1751
The Transport Act 1962 (Commencement No.1) Order 1962 SI 1962/1788
Nationalised Transport (London Fares) Order 1962 (1) SI 1962/1880

2000-2499
The Cambridge Waterworks (No. 2) Order 1962 SI 1962/2130
The Exchange of Securities (No.4) Rules 1962 SI 1962/2140
The Exchange of Securities (No.5) Rules 1962 SI 1962/2167
The Copyright (Virgin Islands) Order 1962 SI 1962/2185
Transport Holding Company (Procedure) Order 1962 (1) SI 1962/2281
The Evidence by Certificate Rules 1962 SI 1962/2319
The Control of Dogs on Roads Orders (Procedure) (England and Wales) Regulations 1962 SI 1962/2340
The Double Taxation Relief (Taxes on Income) (South Africa) Order 1962 SI 1962/2352
The Sheriffs' Fees (Amendment) Order 1962 SI 1962/2417
The Post-War Credit (Income Tax) Amendment Regulations, 1962 SI 1962/2455
The Exchange of Securities (No.6) Rules 1962 SI 1962/2486

2500-2877
The Veterinary Surgery (Exemptions) Order 1962 SI 1962/2557
The Evidence (British Antarctic Territory) Order 1962 SI 1962/2605
The Evidence (Certain Provinces of Canada) Order 1962 SI 1962/2606
The Evidence (Falkland Islands) Order 1962 SI 1962/2607
The Evidence (Seychelles) Order 1962 SI 1962/2608
The Evidence (Sierra Leone) Order 1962 SI 1962/2609
The Trustee Investments (Additional Powers) (No.2) Order, 1962 SI 1962/2611
The Transport Act 1962 (Vesting Date) Order 1962 SI 1962/2634
The Radioactive Substances (Fire Detectors) Exemption Order 1962 SI 1962/2640
The Radioactive Substances (Civil Defence) Exemption Order 1962 SI 1962/2641
The Radioactive Substances (Electronic Valves) Exemption Order 1962 SI 1962/2642
The Radioactive Substances (Testing Instruments) Exemption Order 1962 SI 1962/2643
The Radioactive Substances (Luminous Articles) Exemption Order 1962 SI 1962/2644
The Radioactive Substances (Exhibitions) Exemption Order 1962 SI 1962/2645
The Radioactive Substances (Storage in Transit) Exemption Order 1962 SI 1962/2646
The Radioactive Substances (Phosphatic Substances, Rare Earths etc.) Exemption Order 1962 SI 1962/2648
The Radioactive Substances (Lead) Exemption Order 1962 SI 1962/2649
London Transport (Consent Procedure) Regulations 1962 (1) SI 1962/2707
The Radioactive Substances (Uranium and Thorium) Exemption Order 1962 SI 1962/2710
The Radioactive Substances (Prepared Uranium and Thorium Compounds) Exemption Order 1962 SI 1962/2711
The Radioactive Substances (Geological Specimens) Exemption Order 1962 SI 1962/2712
The British Transport Reorganisation (Pensions of Employees) (No.1) Order 1962 SI 1962/2714
The British Transport Reorganisation (Pensions of Employees) (No.2) Order 1962 SI 1962/2715
The National Insurance (Modification of the Police Pensions Act 1948) Regulations 1962 SI 1962/2755
The British Transport Reorganisation (Pensions of Employees) (No.3) Order 1962 SI 1962/2758
The Double Taxation Relief (Taxes on Income) (South West Africa) Order 1962 SI 1962/2788
The Pipe-lines Act 1962 (Commencement) Order 1962 SI 1962/2790
The British Transport Reorganisation (Pensions of Employees) (No.4) Order 1962 SI 1962/2793
The British Transport Reorganisation (Compensation to Employees) Regulations 1962 SI 1962/2834
The Redistribution of Business (Revenue paper) Order 1962 SI 1962/2877

Unreferenced Listings
The following 12 items were previously listed on this article, however are unreferenced on the authorities site, included here for a "no loss" approach.

Post Office Register (Trustee Savings Banks) (Amendment) Regulations 1962  SI 1962/112
Sandwith Anhydrite Mine (Lighting) Special Regulations 1962 SI 1962/192
Thistleton Mine Special Regulations 1962 SI 1962/364
Sheffield Water (Regrouping) Order 1962 SI 1962/478
Rotherham Corporation Water Order 1962 SI 1962/485
Tendring Hundred Water (No. 2) Order 1962 SI 1962/761
Sheffield (Amendment of Local Enactment) Order 1962 SI 1962/1249
Force Crag Mine (Storage Battery Locomotives) Special Regulations 1962 SI 1962/1501
Doncaster and District Joint Water Board Order 1962 SI 1962/1924
Jamaica (Constitution) Order in Council 1962 SI 1962/1500
Several and Regulated Fisheries (Form of Application) Regulations 1962 SI 1962/2158
Barnsley Water (Penistone Boreholes) Order 1962 SI 1962/2873

References

External links
Legislation.gov.uk delivered by the UK National Archive
UK SI's on legislation.gov.uk
UK Draft SI's on legislation.gov.uk

See also
List of Statutory Instruments of the United Kingdom

Statutory Instruments
Lists of Statutory Instruments of the United Kingdom